Yrjölä is a Finnish surname.

Geographical distribution
As of 2014, 96.8% of all known bearers of the surname Yrjölä were residents of Finland (frequency 1:5,394), 1.7% of Sweden (1:547,042) and 1.1% of Estonia (1:110,139).

In Finland, the frequency of the surname was higher than national average (1:5,394) in the following regions:
 1. Kymenlaakso (1:904)
 2. Päijänne Tavastia (1:2,241)
 3. Pirkanmaa (1:2,258)
 4. Tavastia Proper (1:4,286)
 5. Uusimaa (1:4,777)

People
 Iivari Yrjölä (1899–1985), Finnish athlete
 Paavo Yrjölä (1902–1980), Finnish track and field athlete
 Eero Yrjölä (born 1925), Finnish diplomat
 Matti Yrjölä (born 1938), Finnish shot putter
 Tuula Yrjölä, Finnish diplomat
 Lassi Yrjölä (born 1994), Finnish ice hockey goaltender

References

Finnish-language surnames
Surnames of Finnish origin